The 1891 Doane Tigers football team represented Doane College in the 1891 college football season.

Schedule

References

Doane
Doane Tigers football seasons
Doane Tigers football